The ceremonial county of Hampshire, which includes the unitary authorities of Portsmouth and Southampton, is divided into 18 parliamentary constituencies: 9 borough constituencies and 9 county constituencies.

Constituencies

2010 boundary changes

Under the Fifth Periodic Review of Westminster constituencies, the Boundary Commission for England decided to increase the number of seats which covered Hampshire from 17 to 18, with the creation of Meon Valley. As a consequence of resulting boundary changes, Romsey was renamed Romsey and Southampton North. The Aldershot and Basingstoke seats, more predominantly urban than previously defined, were redesignated as borough constituencies.

Proposed boundary changes 
See 2023 Periodic Review of Westminster constituencies for further details.

Following the abandonment of the Sixth Periodic Review (the 2018 review), the Boundary Commission for England formally launched the 2023 Review on 5 January 2021. Initial proposals were published on 8 June 2021 and, following two periods of public consultation, revised proposals were published on 8 November 2022. Final proposals will be published by 1 July 2023.

The commission has proposed that Hampshire be combined with Berkshire and Surrey as a sub-region of the South East Region. As a result, parts of the current constituency of East Hampshire would be included in a new cross-county boundary constituency named Farnham and Bordon. In addition, Fareham and Meon Valley would be abolished and replaced by Fareham and Waterlooville, and Hamble Valley.

The following constituencies are proposed:

Containing electoral wards from Basingstoke and Deane

 Basingstoke
 East Hampshire (part)
 North East Hampshire (part)
 North West Hampshire (part)

Containing electoral wards from East Hampshire

 East Hampshire (part)
 Farnham and Bordon (also includes part in the Surrey borough of Waverley)

Containing electoral wards from Eastleigh

 Eastleigh (part)
 Hamble Valley (part)

Containing electoral wards from Fareham

 Fareham and Waterlooville (part)
 Gosport (part)
 Hamble Valley (part)

Containing electoral wards from Gosport

 Gosport (part)

Containing electoral wards from Hart

 Aldershot (part)
 North East Hampshire (part)

Containing electoral wards from Havant

 Fareham and Waterlooville (part)
 Havant

Containing electoral wards from New Forest

 New Forest East 
 New Forest West

Containing electoral wards from Portsmouth

 Portsmouth North
 Portsmouth South 

Containing electoral wards from Rushmoor

 Aldershot (part)

Containing electoral wards from Southampton

 Romsey and Southampton North (part)
 Southampton Itchen
 Southampton Test

Containing electoral wards from Test Valley

 Eastleigh (part)
 North West Hampshire (part)
 Romsey and Southampton North (part)

Containing electoral wards from Winchester

 Fareham and Waterlooville (part)
 Hamble Valley (part)
 Winchester

Results history
Primary data source: House of Commons research briefing - General election results from 1918 to 2019. The Isle of Wight is excluded throughout.

2019 
The number of votes cast for each political party who fielded candidates in constituencies comprising Hampshire in the 2019 general election were as follows:

Percentage votes 
Note that before 1983 Hampshire also included the Bournemouth and Christchurch areas.

1Including National Liberal, and one National candidate in 1945

2pre-1979: Liberal Party; 1983 & 1987 - SDP-Liberal Alliance

* Included in Other

Accurate vote percentages for the 1918, 1922 and 1931 elections cannot be obtained because at least one candidate stood unopposed.

Seats 

11983 & 1987 - SDP-Liberal Alliance

Maps

1950-1979

1983-present

Historical representation by party
A cell marked → (with a different colour background to the preceding cell) indicates that the previous MP continued to sit under a new party name. Unlike elsewhere in this article, the Isle of Wight is included in these tables.

1885 to 1918

1918 to 1950

1950 to 1983

1983 to present

See also
 List of parliamentary constituencies in the South East (region)

Notes

References

Politics of Hampshire
Hampshire
 
 Hampshire
Parliamentary constituencies